The dialects of Macedonian comprise the Slavic dialects spoken in the Republic of North Macedonia as well as some varieties spoken in the wider geographic region of Macedonia. They are part of the dialect continuum of South Slavic languages that joins Macedonian with Bulgarian to the east and Torlakian to the north into the group of the Eastern South Slavic languages. The precise delimitation between these languages is fleeting and controversial.

Macedonian authors tend to treat all dialects spoken in the geographical region of Macedonia as Macedonian, including those spoken in the westernmost part of Bulgaria (so-called Pirin Macedonia), whereas Bulgarian authors treat all Macedonian dialects as part of the Bulgarian language. Prior to the codification of standard Macedonian in 1945, the dialects of Macedonia were for the most part classified as Bulgarian. In Greece, the identification of the dialects spoken by the local Slavophone minority with either Bulgarian or Macedonian is often avoided, and these dialects are instead described simply as "Slavic", Dopia ('Local'), Stariski (old) or Našinski (ours).

Linguistically, the dialects of Macedonia in the wider sense can be divided into Eastern and Western groups (the boundary runs approximately from Skopje and Skopska Crna Gora along the rivers Vardar and Crna) based on a large group of features. In addition, a more detailed classification can be based on the modern reflexes of the Proto-Slavic reduced vowels ("yers"), vocalic sonorants and the back nasal (o). That classification distinguishes between the following 3 major groups:

Dialects

Northern dialects
 Western group:
 Tetovo dialect
 Skopska Crna Gora dialect
 Gora dialect
 Eastern group:
 Kumanovo dialect
 Kratovo dialect
 Kriva Palanka dialect
 Ovče Pole dialect

Western Dialects:
 Central group:
 Prilep-Bitola dialect
 Kičevo-Poreče dialect
 Skopje-Veles dialect
 Western and north western group:
 Gostivar dialect
 Reka dialect
 Galičnik (Mala Reka) dialect
 Debar dialect
 Drimkol-Golo Brdo dialect
 Vevčani-Radožda dialect
 Struga dialect
 Ohrid dialect
 Upper Prespa dialect
 Lower Prespa dialect

Eastern and Southern dialects
 Eastern group:
 Tikveš-Mariovo dialect
 Štip-Kočani dialect
 Strumica dialect
 Maleševo-Pirin dialect
 South-western group:
 Nestram-Kostenar dialect
 Korča (Gorica) dialect
 Kostur dialect
 South-eastern group:
 Solun-Voden dialect
 Ser-Drama-Lagadin-Nevrokop dialect

Most linguists classify the dialects in the Pirin (Blagoevgrad) region of Bulgaria and in the far east of Greek Macedonia as Bulgarian and the dialects in the rest of Greece and in Republic of North Macedonia as Macedonian.

Variation in consonants

The Eastern region preserves  (except Tikveš-Mariovo and Kumanovo-Kriva Palanka) and intervocalic . The East is also characterised by the development of epenthetic  before original  where the West has epenthetic : Eastern  (coal) but Western . The diphonemic reflexes are most characteristic of the dialects of Greek Macedonia and Blagoevgrad Province, Kostur-Korča and Ohrid-Prespa. The Serres – Nevrokop dialects have a series of phonemically palatalised consonants.

Variation in word stress and its effects on vowels
The Western dialects generally have fixed stress, antepenultimate in the Republic of North Macedonia, and penultimate in Greece and Albania. The Eastern region, along with the neighbouring Bulgarian dialects, has various non-fixed stress systems. The reduction of unstressed vowels (as well as the aforementioned allophonic palatalisation of consonants) is characteristic of East Bulgarian as opposed to West Bulgarian dialects, so these dialects are regarded by Bulgarian linguists as transitional between East and West Bulgarian.

External links 
 Digital resources of Macedonian dialects
 Audio recordings, examples from the collection of Bozhidar Vidoeski — Center for areal linguistics - MANU
 Map of Macedonian dialects with sample texts and audio recordings — Center for areal linguistics - MANU

References

Macedonian language